Panakkad Pokoya Thangal Memorial Higher Secondary School, Kottukkara, or P.P..M.H.S.S. India, was established in 1976 and run by the Nediyiruppu Muslim Educational Socialization. The school is situated 2 km away from kondotty and close to National Highway 213 .

History
Initially the school had three divisions with 112 students.  It now has 4000 students in 55 divisions. The higher secondary section started in 2000-2001 with three batches i.e. two Science (Biology) and one Humanities (Statistics). In 2002 it started three additional batches i.e.  Computer science, Sociology and Commerce.

At higher secondary level there are around 800 students. There is a strength of 150 staff. The school has won the overall championship in almost all extracurricular activities in the Malappuram Educational District.

Courses for HSE
 Science ( Physics, Chemistry, Maths, Biology )
 Computer Science (Physics, Chemistry, Maths, Computer Science)
 Commerce
 Humanities

Achievements
 The district Panchayat trophy to honour schools  with highest pass percent in the district has been with PPMHSS for a consecutive  9 years.
 Dr. Mohiyidheen  rolling trophy sponsored by the State Arabic Unit of Public Education given to the school having the highest percent with Arabic as the first language.
 Former Head Master K. Khassim was chosen for the State Level Award for the best Teacher in 1996.
 K.P. Ahammed (Head Master) received National Award for the teachers with excellent and dedicated service.
 In science fair the school won the credit of being the best science school at state level in 2000.
 In  2003, the school won overall championships in Malappuram Education District fair for Science, Mathematics and Social Science.
  The students got prizes in the South Indian Science Fair held in Shimogo, Salem, Pondicheery..
 Students won at the National Science Fair in Ahamadabad, Hyderabad, Haryana and Chennai.

See also
 Nediyiruppu

Schools in Malappuram district
Educational institutions established in 1976
1976 establishments in Kerala